B-EDGE (also known as Carlos Toshiki & B-EDGE from 2017 to 2019) are a Japanese-American jazz band based in Japan. The band currently consists of drummer and leader Marty Bracey, bassist Wornell Jones, saxophonist and percussionist Teruo Gotō, pianist Tomoharu Hani, and guitarist Nishiyama "Hank" Fumio. The group would be joined by former Omega Tribe vocalist Carlos Toshiki on multiple occasions and officially from 2017 to 2019.

History

2015–2017: Formation and first works 
Marty Bracey and Teruo Gotō had previously worked together as a backing band for 1986 Omega Tribe, originally with bassist Shigeru Watanabe, previously the bassist for Monta and Brothers alongside Bracey, before replacing Watanabe with Wornell Jones. The trio would continue to play in the band when it was renamed to Carlos Toshiki & Omega Tribe and at their final concerts before disbandment. Many years later in 2015, the trio formed B-EDGE, getting guitarist Nishiyama "Hank" Fumio and pianist Tomoharu Hani to join the band as well. On November 11, 2015, they released their debut album Easy Loving You, which included a single with former Psy-S singer Mami "Chaka" Yasunori.

2017–2019: Carlos Toshiki & B-EDGE 
In 2017, Carlos Toshiki, the lead vocalist of 1986 and Carlos Toshiki & Omega Tribe, came out of his musical retirement and joined the band as their vocalist. He was featured on their debut single "Give Me All You Got" on a cover of his song "Sentimental No! No!" On February 21, 2018, they released their only album under the name, Nova Nostalgia, which covered many songs from the Omega Tribe era. Days later, the group started their Turne do Japão 2018 at Cotton Club Japan and ended on March 9. The tour also included keyboardist Haruhiko Wada and backing vocalist Yumi Kazu and ended with all venues sold out.

A year later, the group would begin touring in the Tour Final de Verão 2019, their final tour under the name.

2019–present: Return to B-EDGE 
After the Tour Final de Verão 2019, Toshiki returned to Brazil and the band kept playing gigs at clubs. They released their third album Meteo on March 11, 2020.

Members 
Marty Bracey – drums
Wornell Jones – bass, vocals
Teruo Gotō – saxophone, flute, percussion
Tomoharu Hani – piano, keyboards
Nishiyama "Hank" Fumio – guitar
Carlos Toshiki – lead vocals

Backing band 
Haruhiko Wada – keyboards
Tomoka Suzuki – backing vocals
Suzi Kim – backing vocals
Yumi Kazu – backing vocals

Other vocalists 
Mami "Chaka" Yasunori (2015)
Argie Phine (2018)
Renaja (2020)

Discography

Studio albums

Singles

References 

Musical groups established in 2015
Omega Tribe (Japanese band)
2015 establishments in Japan